Jurbarkas District Municipality is a municipality in Tauragė County, Lithuania

Elderships 
Jurbarkas District Municipality is divided into 12 elderships:

Population by locality

Status: M, MST - city, town / K, GST - village / VS - steading

References 

 
Municipalities of Tauragė County
Municipalities of Lithuania